Hasan Kandi (also Romanized as Ḩasan Kandī) is a village in Baba Jik Rural District, in the Central District of Chaldoran County, West Azerbaijan Province, Iran. At the 2006 census, its population was 41, in 7 families.

References 

Populated places in Chaldoran County